John Blizek is an American film and television editor, born in the suburbs of Chicago, Illinois.   His credits include Pound Puppies and the Legend of Big Paw, and early episodes of Mighty Morphin Power Rangers.

He was nominated for two ACE Awards.

References

External links

American film editors
Living people
People from Chicago
Year of birth missing (living people)